The 2010 Champions League Twenty20 was the second edition of the Champions League Twenty20, an international Twenty20 cricket tournament. The tournament, which was held from 10 to 26 September 2010 in South Africa, featured 10 domestic Twenty20 teams from India, Australia, Sri Lanka, New Zealand, the West Indies and South Africa.

The Chennai Super Kings emerged the winners of the tournament, defeating the Warriors in the final. Murali Vijay from the Chennai Super Kings won the Golden Bat Award and was declared the Man of the Match of the final, while Ravichandran Ashwin was awarded the Golden Wicket Award and declared the Player of the Tournament.

The song "I Like It" by Enrique Iglesias was taken as the official song for the 2010 Champions League Twenty20. Enrique performed the song along with "Be With You" at the opening ceremony of the tournament.

Host selection 
In February 2010, Cricket South Africa announced that South Africa was chosen as the host of the tournament. This was later denied by tournament chairman Lalit Modi, who listed South Africa, Australia, England, India and the Middle East all as possible contenders for hosting the tournament. On 25 April 2010, at the conclusion of the 2010 Indian Premier League, it was announced that South Africa was officially chosen as the host of the tournament. South Africa had previously hosted other senior Twenty20 tournaments, including the 2007 ICC World Twenty20 and the 2009 Indian Premier League.

Format 
The tournament consisted of the ten top domestic teams from six countries as determined by the domestic Twenty20 tournaments of those countries. The tournament consists of 23 matches, and is divided into a group stage and a knockout stage. If a match ends in a tie, a Super Over will be played to determine the winner.

The group stage has the teams divided into two equal groups, with each playing a round-robin tournament. The top two teams of each group advance to the knockout stage. The knockout stage consists of two semi-finals, with the top team of one group facing the second from the other. The winners of the semi-finals play the grand final to determine the winner of the competition.

Prize money 
Unchanged from the previous edition, the total prize money for the competition is US$6 million. In addition to the prize money, each team receives a participation fee of $500,000. The prize money will be distributed as follows:

 $200,000 – Each team eliminated in the group stage
 $500,000 – Each semi-finalist
 $1.3 million – Runners-up
 $2.5 million – Winners

Controversies arose after the conclusion of the tournament, when teams reported to have not received their tournament prize money, which was due to be paid by the end of January 2011. As of 9 March 2011, the full $6 million has yet to be paid to the teams. The participation fees have also yet to be paid.

Teams 
This tournament had two teams less compared to the previous edition due to the absence of English county teams because the tournament dates clashed with the end of England's domestic season. The England national team also had a One Day International series with Pakistan during the tournament period. The format of the tournament was modified to accommodate this.

Apart from England, Pakistan is the only other top-eight Test-playing nation not to be represented in the tournament. In February 2010, Ijaz Butt, the chairman of the Pakistan Cricket Board, had reportedly refused participation in the tournament due to the snubbing of Pakistani cricketers in the 2010 Indian Premier League player auction. The auction resulted in none of them being bought for the league. Butt later stated his comments were misunderstood, but the Champions League administrators had already decided to leave out Pakistan due to Butt's statements. Champions League officials have made contradicting statements as to whether a Pakistan team would have been considered regardless of Butt's statement. Pakistan was also absent from the previous edition due to the deterioration of relations between host nation India and Pakistan.

The tournament featured only three teams from the previous edition. Other teams failed to qualify, including the 2008 champions and runners-up, the New South Wales Blues of Australia and Trinidad and Tobago.

Squads 

Several teams were missing star players that helped them qualify for the tournament, mostly due to their commitment to another qualified team or to their national team. In the case of a player being a part of more than one qualified team, he can play for his "home" team (the team from the country he is eligible to represent in international cricket) without consequence. If he plays for any other team, that team must pay the home team US$200,000 as compensation. The Royal Challengers Bangalore were the only team to pay the compensation, forcing three international players to play for them instead of their home team. Jacques Kallis, Cameron White and Ross Taylor were obligated to play for Bangalore as their contracts stated Bangalore had first rights over them should they qualify for the tournament with another team.

Venues 
The tournament was hosted at four venues across South Africa. All four venues were used in the group stage. Both the Warriors and Highveld Lions played some of their group stage matches at their respective home grounds of St George's Park and Wanderers Stadium. The semi-finals were held at Sahara Stadium Kingsmead and Supersport Park while the final was held at Wanderers Stadium.

Fixtures and results 
All times shown are in South African Standard Time (UTC+02).

Group stage

Group A

Group B

Knockout stage 

Semi-finals

Final

Final standings

Statistics

Most runs

Most wickets

References

External links 
 Tournament site – CricInfo

2010
Champions League Twenty20
Champions League Twenty20
South African domestic cricket competitions